The 1923 Men's World Weightlifting Championships were held in Vienna, Austria from September 8 to September 9, 1923. There were 76 men in action from 7 nations.

Medal summary

Medal table

References
Results (Sport 123)
Weightlifting World Championships Seniors Statistics

External links
International Weightlifting Federation

World Weightlifting Championships
World Weightlifting Championships
World Weightlifting Championships
International weightlifting competitions hosted by Austria